Philip O. Emafo, a Nigerian, is a former president of the International Narcotics Control Board and a vocal critic of drug legalization. Prior to serving on the INCB, he was a pharmacist.

References
International Narcotics Control Board Elects Professor Hamid Ghodse of Iran as President, May 18, 2004.
International Narcotics Control Board Re-elects Dr. Emafo of Nigeria as President, UN Information Service, May 27, 2003.
Interview with Dr. Philip O. Emafo, The Update, Dec. 2002.

Living people
Nigerian diplomats
Year of birth missing (living people)